Maike Hausberger (born 9 January 1995) is a German Paralympic cyclist who competes in international elite competitions, she is also a former Paralympic athlete and triathlete. Hausberger switched to cycling in 2017 because of sporting injuries in her track and field career.

References

External links
 
 

1995 births
Living people
Sportspeople from Trier
Paralympic athletes of Germany
Paralympic cyclists of Germany
German female sprinters
German female long jumpers
German female cyclists
German female triathletes
Athletes (track and field) at the 2012 Summer Paralympics
Athletes (track and field) at the 2016 Summer Paralympics
Medalists at the World Para Athletics European Championships
Cyclists from Rhineland-Palatinate
21st-century German women